Al-Jezoli Hussien Nouh Mohamed (born 24 October 2002) is a Sudanese professional footballer who plays as a winger for Al-Merrikh and the Sudan national football team.

References 

Living people
2002 births
Sudanese footballers
Sudan international footballers
Association football forwards
Al-Merrikh SC players
2021 Africa Cup of Nations players
Sudan A' international footballers
2022 African Nations Championship players